Alexandra Stamatopoulou (born 7 September 1986) is a Greek Paralympic swimmer. She represented Greece at the Paralympic Games.

Career
Stamatopoulou represented Greece at the 2016 Summer Paralympics and at the 2020 Summer Paralympics. In Tokyo she won the bronze medal in the 50 metre backstroke S4 event.

References

1986 births
Living people
Swimmers from Athens
Greek female freestyle swimmers
Medalists at the World Para Swimming Championships
Medalists at the World Para Swimming European Championships
Paralympic swimmers of Greece
Swimmers at the 2016 Summer Paralympics
Swimmers at the 2020 Summer Paralympics
Medalists at the 2020 Summer Paralympics
Paralympic medalists in swimming
S4-classified Paralympic swimmers
Greek female backstroke swimmers